The Leigh Yawkey Woodson Art Museum is located in Wausau, Wisconsin. It is best known for its annual "Birds in Art" exhibition, which exhibits contemporary artistic representations of birds. The annual exhibition has been held beginning the week after Labor Day since the museum's founding in 1976. The museum stands on a  estate in a 1931 English Tudor style house previously owned by Alice Woodson Forester and John E. Forester. The Foresters donated their home in 1973 and the museum opened in September 1976.

Images

References

External links 
Leigh Yawkey Woodson Art Museum Home Page

Art museums and galleries in Wisconsin
Wausau, Wisconsin
Museums in Marathon County, Wisconsin
Art museums established in 1976
1976 establishments in Wisconsin
Houses in Marathon County, Wisconsin